Apteromantis bolivari is a species of praying mantis found in Algeria, Morocco, and Portugal.

See also
List of mantis genera and species

References

Mantodea of Africa
bolivari
Insects described in 1929